"Made in America" is a song co-written and recorded by American country music singer Toby Keith. It was released in June 2011 as the first single from his 2011 album Clancy's Tavern. The song reached number one on the US Billboard Hot Country Songs chart for the week of October 15, 2011. Keith wrote this song with Bobby Pinson and Scott Reeves.

Background and writing
Keith wrote the song with frequent collaborator Bobby Pinson and actor/singer Scott Reeves. Keith told Billboard magazine that they wrote the song in early 2010 and he almost left it off the album because of the number of other patriotic songs he has recorded. Pinson told Taste of Country that he and Reeves started talking about buying American-made merchandise to support the country. After writing part of the song, they thought it sounded like something Keith would record, so Pinson took what he had finished to Keith, who helped him complete the song. To date, this is Keith's last number one song.

Content
The song is an uptempo, in which an older farmer (Keith's own father, according to the song), a retired United States Marine, and his schoolteacher wife, who will only buy American products, are disgusted by the influx of foreign goods, from cars to cotton.

Critical reception
Billy Dukes of Taste of Country gave the song three stars out of five. He thought that Keith "sings with plenty of passion", but criticized the lyrics by saying, "While the song doesn’t feel like a remake of his previous anthems, it doesn’t live up to their high watermark, either." Matt Bjorke of Roughstock rated it four stars out of five, saying that while it is a 'list song', it had "strongly constructed lyrics". Former UFC fighter Dan Henderson used the song as his entrance music.

Music video
Keith filmed the video in Cedarburg, Wisconsin during an Independence Day parade and in Milwaukee, Wisconsin during his performance at Summerfest. It was directed by Michael Salomon.

Chart performance

Year-end charts

Certifications

References

2011 singles
2011 songs
Toby Keith songs
Songs written by Toby Keith
Songs written by Bobby Pinson
Music videos directed by Michael Salomon
Show Dog-Universal Music singles
American patriotic songs